Big Questions is an Australian television show which is produced and broadcast on the Nine Network, with Jules Lund as host.  It commenced broadcasting on 19 October 2006. It shouldn't be confused with the Sydney Morning Herald column of the same name in the Saturday edition that poses sometimes serious, sometimes whimsical questions answered by readers. Prolific contributors are John Moir, Jim Dewar and David Buley.

Premise 
The show features 2 panels each with two people debating on a popular question which divides people's opinions. Examples include Seinfeld or Friends, The Beatles or the Rolling Stones and Speedos or Board shorts. A live audience casts their vote on which is the better of the two.

Many celebrities have been chosen to debate the issues:
Red Symons
Tom Gleeson
Kate Kendall
Andy Lee
Hamish Blake
Tottie Goldsmith
Leo Sayer
Sami Lukis
Akmal Saleh
Human Nature
Livinia Nixon
Trevor Marmalade

So far the audience has voted on

There is no news whether Big Questions will return on Channel 9 after a seven-year hiatus.

Background
Upon the program's commencement, there had been an increasing trend of pop culture panel programs on Australian television. The success of the ABC's Spicks and Specks began the popular trend and has been replicated, often unsuccessfully on other networks.

External links 
 

Nine Network original programming
2006 Australian television series debuts
2006 Australian television series endings